Spotted mandarin may refer to:
Synchiropus picturatus, a colorful fish used in the aquarium trade
Prosartes maculata, a wildflower of the genus Prosartes